Yosef Tunkel (1881 – August 9, 1949) was a Jewish–Belarusian–American writer of poetry and humorous prose in Yiddish commonly known by the pen name Der Tunkeler or 'The dark one' in Yiddish.

Biography
Born into the family of a poor teacher in Babruysk (in Belarus, then part of the Russian Empire), Tunkel was a sickly child whose drawing ability prompted charitable members of the community to send him to art school in Vilno. He finished his studies in 1899 and, too short sighted to be a painter, turned to writing. His poetry was first published in Der yud (Warsaw) in 1901 and from then on his poems, satires, drama and children's stories appeared in Yiddish publications throughout Europe and North America.

Between 1906 and 1910 he travelled to the United States where he started the humorous journal Der kibitser (continued for two decades under the title Der Groyser Kundes). Moving to Warsaw in 1911 he wrote for Der moment, editing its humour pages, Der krumer spiegel, or The Crooked Mirror. He spent World War I in Ukraine, mainly in Kiev and Odessa. In the early twenties, he adapted several works of German poet Wilhelm Busch.

When the Warsaw cabaret Azazel opened in 1925, Der Tunkeler's writings were part of the repertoire; his works were staged in Łódź and the Warsaw cabaret theater Sambatyon (which opened in 1927) as well.

In 1931 he visited what was then the British Mandate of Palestine. The outbreak of World War II found him in Belgium from which he escaped into France only to be arrested by the Vichy authorities. Escaping in 1941 he managed to find his way to the US once more, where he wrote for the major New York Yiddish daily The Jewish Daily Forward despite failing health. He died there in 1949.

Throughout his life, numerous collections of his work were published in Warsaw, Kiev and New York. He is remembered as one of the Yiddish language's outstanding humorists to this day.

"Der Tunkeler" (Iosef Tunkel) bibliography 
Published by Roman Tunkel,
distant relatives of Tunkeler.
Each statement of article is supported by photo-copy of corresponding document.
A more detailed and accurate Russian version of "Дер Тункелер" biography is located at: :ru:Тункель, Иосиф.

Chronology 
1878 Iosel Tunkel is born in Babruysk. He was born into a poor family and his father was a poor Melamed. As a child he suffers from illnesses and is lame. At age fifteen, he travels to Vilnius where he studies at the Trutnevs Art School.

1899 Completes his education at the Vilnius Trutnevs Art School.

1899-1901 Due to extreme near-sightedness, he abandons a career in art and instead devotes himself to literature. 
He wanders from city to city pawning his stories and returns occasionally to Babruysk. Publishes his first poems in Joseph Luria's Yiddish newspaper Der Yud (The Jew).

1906-1910 Travels to the United States and lives in New York. Founds two successful and long-lasting humor magazines - Der Kibbitzer (The Kibbitzer) and Di Groyser Kundes (The Big Stick).

1910 Returns to Babruysk due to family emergency.

1911 Moves to Warsaw. Becomes a regular contributor to the magazine Der Moment. Starts using the pseudonyms "Khoshekh" and "Der Tunkeler". Eventually Iosef Tunkel becomes the editor of the weekly humor supplement called 
Der Kromer Shpigel (The Bent Mirror).

1914-1918 During World War I, Iosef Tunkel returns to Babruysk and from there to Kiev and Odessa where he publishes several short works. Returns to independent Poland after the war. Returns to Der Moment, while occasionally writing for other newspapers such as Der Haynt and the Folkszeitung (People's Paper) under the pseudonym Androginus.

1920s Publishes numerous books, plays, feuilletons, parodies and humorous articles. Often personally acts out his works on stage as he travels around the country. Travels to Israel. Is feted by the Hebrew Writers Union and Khaim Nakhman Bialik, who declares himself as a great admirer of Der Tunkeler's works. He subsequently writes his first travel narrative based on his experiences in the Holy Land.

1932–33 Iosef Tunkel travels to the United States to visit his brothers and old friends as well as to gather material for a travel narrative. He stays in Springfield where his brother Alex and sister-in-law Rose live.

1934? Travels to the Soviet Union to gather material for a subsequently published travel narrative. Lives in Paris for some time.

1939 Travels to Belgium to collect material for another travel narrative when the Germans invade Poland and World War II breaks out. Illegally crosses the border into France with a group of Jewish refugees. Due to his lame leg, he is captured by the French police and sent to a detention center for foreign Jews in Strasbourg. In the camp, he befriends the Parisian novelist W. Wowiorka. Miraculously escapes the camp and somehow finds his way to the United States in April 1941. He resides permanently in New York and quickly finds employment with Der Forverts, the New York Yiddish daily newspaper.

1943 Publishes the autobiographical work Goles: Ksovim von a Flichtling (Exile - The Writings of an Exile) about his experiences in Belgium and France in an attempt to shed light on the plight of European Jewry.

1948 Tunkel publishes his last book Der Groyser Genits Oder a Nudner Tag in Nyu York (The Great Genius or an Annoying Day in New York). His last work of literature is an article for the Lithuanian Yizkor Book Lite "The Chapter of Vilna in my Life" which is published posthumously in 1951. His physical health shattered by his experiences in the French camps, he spends the last several years of his life ill and nearly blind.

1949 On August 9, 1949 (14 Av, 5709) Iosef Tunkel dies and is interred in the New Mount Carmel cemetery in Ridgewood, Queens, New York.

Collections 
Humoristishe Bibliotek, 5 Vol., (Vol. 1: Gelechter un a Zat, Vol. 2: Ich Lach fun Aych, Vol. 3: Miten Kop Aroyp, Vol. 4: Oyf-tsu-cloymersht, Vol. 5: Das Freiliki Teater), (Vol 3 and 4 printed at Wilna). (HUC)

Articles 
 "Dos Kapital Vilna In Mein Leben" in Lite, Dr. Mendel Sudarsk and Uriah Katzenelenbogen eds., Volume 1, 1951, pp 1279–1289.
 "Zikhrones" in Bobruisk: Sefer-Zikharon Lekehilat Bobruisk u Venoteah, Yehuda Slutzky, ed. Volume 2, 1967, p 538–9.

Translations 
 Busch, Wilhelm, 1832 - 1908. Notl un Motl, Farlag Levin-Epstein Bros. and Partners, Warsaw, 1928 (First edition, 1920). 74 pp. Illus. (NYPL) (LNYL)
 Busch, Wilhelm, 1832 - 1908. Di Papirene Shlang, Farlag Levin-Epstein Bros. and Partners, Warsaw, 1921. (2nd edition 1928) 22 pp. Illus. (NYPL) (LNYL)
 Busch, Wilhelm, 1832 - 1908. Kopel un di Genz, Farlag Levin-Epstein Bros. and Partners, Warsaw, 1921. 14 pp. Illus. (NYPL)
 Mann, Thomas, Jacob un Esau.

Newspapers and journals 
 Der Kibitzer: Monatlikher Illustirter Zhurnal Far Humor, Vits un Kibets, Vol 1-8, New York (1908–1914). Illus. (HUC) (NYPL) (H) (YLLP)
 Der Groyser Kundes: A Zhurnal fir Humor, Vits un Satire, 12/15/1908 - 9/9/1927, New York. (H) (YLLP)
 Der Kromer Shpigel, Editor of the weekly humor supplement for the magazine Der Moment.

References to Iosef Tunkel 
 "Der Tunkeler" in Ravitch, Melekh, Mayn Leksikon (My Dictionary), Vol. II, Northern Printing un Stashonery, Montreal, Canada, 1945., pp 101 – 3.
 "Tunkeler, Der" in Zylbercweig, Zalman, Leksikon fon Yidishe Teatr, (Dictionary of Yiddish Theater) Vol. II, Libris Publishers, Warsaw, 1934, pp 865 – 866.
 "Tunkel, Iosef 'Der Tunkeler"" in Raskin, Shaul, Leksikon fun der Nayer Yidisher Literatur (Dictionary of the New Yiddish Literature), Vol. I, Marstin Press, New York, 1961, pp 47 - 51.
 "Tunkel Iosef" in Encyclopaedia Judaica, p 1451.
 "Tunkel, Iosef 'Der Tunkeler'" in Landman, Isaac, ed. The Universal Jewish Encyclopedia, Vol 10, Ktav Publishing House, Inc., New York, 1969, pp 324 – 5.
 Roback, A. A., Curiosities of Yiddish Literature, Sci - Art Publishers, Cambridge, Massachusetts, 1933, p 62, 192. "Der Tunkeler (J. Tunkel) ranks as the best parodist in Yiddish.", p 62.
 Roback, A. A., The Story of Yiddish Literature, Yiddish Scientific Institute, New York, 1940, p 353.
 Feinsilver, Mermin Lillian, The Taste of Yiddish, South Brunswick Publishers, New York, 1970, p 53, 187.
 Liptzin, Sol, A History of Yiddish Literature, Jonathan David Publishers, New York, 1972, p 274.
 Sadan, Dov, Ke'arot Egozim o Elef Bdikha ve Bdikha, (Nut Bowl or 1001 Jokes), M. Neuman Publishers, Tel Aviv, 1953 (5713), p 213 - 4.
 Gold, David L., "Towards a Critical Edition of Yoysef Tunkl's Notl Un Motl”, Jewish Linguistic Studies, 1989, pp 165 – 173.
 Sheintukh, Yekhiel, "HaBikoret, HaKhevratit-Tarbutit BiKhtavav HaHumoristi'im shel 'Der Tunkeler'" (The Socio-Cultural Criticism in Der Tunkeler's Humorous Writings), The 9th World Congress for Jewish Studies, 1985, pp 457 – 460.
 Sheintukh, Yekhiel, "An Areinfir tsu der Sugiya - Humor in der Yidisher Literatur un der Tunkeler", in Kabakoff, Jacob, Jewish Book Annual, Vol 44, New York, 1986 - 1987 (5747)
 Gotthelf, Yehuda, HaItonut HaYehudit SheHaitah (The Jewish Press That Was), HaIgud HaOlami shel HaItonim HaYehudim, Tel Aviv, 1973, pp. 86, 88, 91, 95, 111, 117, 123, 163, 195, 226, 232, 343.
 Davidon, Yakov, "Lapitch VeTil Oylenshpigel" in Bobruisk Yizkor Book, Tel Aviv, pp 773 – 80 (see pp 775, 779)
 Dluzhshnavsky, M., "Yosef Tunkel (Der Tunkeler): Zayne Letzte Yaren in Nyu York", (Joseph Tunkel (Der Tunkeler): His Last Years in New York), A"Ts, 326,2
(1969) 36 - 39.

Bibliography
 Yo Hasone Haben, Nit Hasone Haben, 19??
 Der Kromer Spiegel: Parodien, Shorushen, und Nacahemungen, Warsaw, 1911. 58 pp. (NUC1) (NYPL)
 Fleder Mayz ... Filietonen, Lieder un Parodien, Verlag A Gittlin, Warsaw, 1912. 71 pp. (HUC) (NYPL,1)
 Der Griner Papugai: A Zamlung fon Monologen, Satiren, un Parodien, Published by Y. Halter, Warsaw, 1912. 72 pp. (NUC1)
 Der Goldener Aeroplan Oder Haim-Yankel Der Hanig Kvetsher, Lewin-Epstein Publishers, Warsaw, 1914. 96 pp. Illus. (NYPL)
 Di Royte Hagada, N. Halperin, Odessa, 1917. 16 pp. (LYS)
 Di Bolshevistishe Hagada, fun Tunkelen Mit ... Masiyos un Meshalim. Mit Perushim un Dinim Wegen Bdikat Khametz un Biur Hametz un Seder-Preven ... M. Goldfein Publishers, Kiev, 1918. 16 pp. (HUC)
 Idishisten, Kiev?, 1918? 15 pp. (NYPL1)
 Molines - in Pensionet, Kiev?, 1918? 15 pp. (NYPL1)
 Zomer-Leb, Kiev, 1918. 15 pp. (LNYL)
 Der Purim-Ber, Odessa, Blimeloch, Odessa, 1919. 22 pp. (LYS)
 Der Humorist. A Shpas in ein Akt, Farlag Levin-Epstein Bros. and Partners, Warsaw, 1920. 28 pp. (NUC1)
 Masa'ot Benyamin HaRevii (Funem Ukrainishe Caos), Farlag "Mizrah un Maarav", New York, 1920. 91 pp. (NUC1)
 Der Hasan, A Shpas in ein Akt, Farlag Levin-Epstein Bros. and Partners, Warsaw, 1920. 26 pp. (NYPL)
 Vikhne-Dvoshe Fort Kayn America, Farlag Humoristishe Bibliotek, Warsaw, 1921. 91 pp. (NUC1) (HUC)
 Kopel un di Genz, Warsaw, 1921 (2nd edition, 1928). 14 pp. Illus. (LNYL)
 Der Regenboygen, Warsaw, 1922. 267 pp. (LNYL)
 Haim Getzel Der Reformator Mit Zaynen 25 Reformen, Farlag "Humoristishes Bibliotek", Warsaw, 1922. 74 pp. Illus. (HUC) (NYPL)
 Katoves, Warsaw, 1923, 134 pp. (LNYL)
 Mit di Fis Aroyf: Neue Humoreskes, Stzenkes un Parodiyes, Achisepher Publishers, Warsaw, 1926?. 211 pp. (NUC1) (NYPL)
 Mitn Kop Arop: Parodiyes, Farlag "Tsentral", Warsaw, 1924 (2nd edition, Wilno, 1931). 189 p. (NUC1,2) (NYPL) (HUC)
 Oyf-tsu-cloymersht: Humoreskes fon Der Tunkeler, B. Klatzkin Publishers, Warsaw and Wilno, 1931. 216 pp. (NUC1,2) (NYPL) (HUC)
 Ikh Lakh fun Aykh: Humoresken, Stzenkes, Gramen, Bucher, Warsaw, 1931. 212 pp. (HUC) (NYPL)
 A Gelechter on a Zayt. Satireskes, Humoreskes, Stzenkes, Achisefer, 1931. 95 pp. (LNYL says 193? pp) (HUC)
 Das Freylike Teater: Eynakters, Stzenkes, Declamatziyes, Bucher Publishers, Warsaw, 1931. 246 pp. (HUC) (NYPL)
 Fort a Yid Kein Eretz Yisroel: "A Reise-Beschreibung", M. Nomberg Publishers, 1932. 278 pp. Illus. (HUC) (NYPL)
 In Gutn Mut: A Zamlung fon Homoreskes, Satires, Groteskes, Parodiyes, and Stzenkes, Kultur Buch, Warsaw, 1936. 222 pp. (NUC1) (NYPL)
 On Gal: Humoreskishes Skitzen, Ferun un Gramen, Warsaw, 1939. 188 pp. (HUC)
 Goles: Ksovim fun a Flichtling, Schreiber Farlag, New York,1943. 95 pp. (NUC1,2) (NYPL) (HUC)
 Der Groyser Genits: Oder a Nudner Tag in Nyu York, A Humoristishe Dertsaylung fon Tunkel, Schreiber Farlag, New York, 1948, 63 pp. (NUC1,2) (NYPL)

References

External links 
 
 “A litvak always manages” Bio and short story
 "Bobruisk" Memoir
 3 satires at Di velt fun yiddish pdfs & mp3s 
 Yosef Tunkls Yerushalayim (Yiddish)

1881 births
1949 deaths
Jewish cabaret performers
People from Babruysk
Jewish poets
American people of Belarusian-Jewish descent
American satirists
Polish cabaret performers
Jews from the Russian Empire
20th-century American poets
Jewish American writers
20th-century American non-fiction writers
Yiddish-language satirists
Emigrants from the Russian Empire to the United States
20th-century pseudonymous writers